Bruce Abbey (born August 18, 1951) is a Canadian former professional ice hockey defenceman who spent his junior hockey career from 1969–1971 with the Peterborough Petes of the Ontario Major Junior Hockey League which later became the OHL (Ontario Hockey League) in 1980. He also played 17 games in the World Hockey Association (WHA) with the Cincinnati Stingers during the 1975–76 WHA season.

References

External links

1951 births
Living people
Cincinnati Stingers players
Canadian ice hockey defencemen
Michigan Tech Huskies men's ice hockey players
Hampton Gulls (SHL) players
Ice hockey people from Ontario
Minnesota North Stars draft picks
People from Elgin County
NCAA men's ice hockey national champions